The Ojai Post was a collaborative blog published online in Ojai, California, since 2006.  It was the only daily local news source in the Ojai Valley (the primary newspaper in Ojai is the Ojai Valley News, printed on Wednesdays and Fridays).  The Ojai Post was non-commercial and had no advertising. The site states that it is currently on hiatus. The original blog posts are no longer archived at the site.

History
The Ojai Post made its debut on February 27, 2006 with a blog post by founder Tyler Suchman entitled Welcome to The Ojai Post!.  It was inspired in part by The Huffington Post, which was launched on May 9, 2005.

The website received considerable visibility in the community with its coverage of the 2006 Day Fire, the sixth largest wildfire in California history. In 2007, The Ojai Post was a key hyperlocal news source for coverage of the Zaca Fire, California's second largest fire in recorded history.

In 2007, The Ojai Post successfully advocated for a chain store ordinance.  Ordinance 798 was passed on November 27, 2007 by the City Council of Ojai, amending the Ojai Municipal Code to regulate chain stores.  This ordinance began with multiple posts on The Ojai Post in opposition to a proposed Subway (restaurant), followed by a Formula Retail Business Initiative drafted by Ojai Post author and local resident Kenley Neufeld and submitted to the City of Ojai.

In 2009, The Ojai Post led coverage of a black bear that came out of the adjacent wilderness, went up a tree in a downtown residential area and was shot out of the tree by the California Department of Fish and Game. The bear was subsequently nicknamed the "Aliso Street Bear" and, alternately, "Elliot."  The story received extensive coverage in the Los Angeles Times, KTLA News, Ventura County Star and other news outlets.

On May 28, 2010, The Ojai Post switched to a new technology platform, migrating from Movable Type to WordPress.

Authors

As a collaborative blog, The Ojai Post provided un-moderated front page posting privileges to over 35 authors.

Notable authors

 Bret Bradigan, former Publisher of the Ojai Valley News
 DK Crawford, restaurant critic and freelance writer
 Suza Francina, former mayor of Ojai
 Gay Hendricks, best-selling author on personal growth and relationships
 Howard Smith, past Chairman of the Board of the Ventura County Economic Development Association
 Lisa Snider, host of Radio Ojai and freelance writer
 Kit Stolz, reporter, story analyst and writer for the Los Angeles Times, Grist (magazine), Sierra and others
 Tyler Suchman, founder of The Ojai Post
 John Wilcock, co-founder of the New York Village Voice

References

Notes

External links
Official  The Ojai Post  website

American blogs
Mass media in Ventura County, California
Ojai, California
Companies based in Ventura County, California